Martin Emil Ferdinand Haller (1835–1925) was a German architect, who designed the Hamburg Rathaus and the building of the Consulate General of the United States in Hamburg, and a member of the Hamburg Parliament.

Early life and family 
Haller was born on 1 December 1835 in Hamburg. His father was the jurist Nicolaus Ferdinand Haller (1805–1876), a Mayor of Hamburg. Haller's mother Adele was a Jewish-born daughter of Amschel Oppenheimer. Haller attended the Gymnasium Gelehrtenschule des Johanneums until 1855. Haller studied architecture in Potsdam, Berlin, Paris, and England.

In 1865, Haller married Antonie (née Schramm, 1846–1925) and had a son, Ferdinand (1871–1963), who was deputy director of the HAPAG, and 3 daughters, Antonie and Marie-Ellen.

Haller died on 26 May 1925 in Hamburg.

Hamburg career 
In 1861 Haller returned to Hamburg and opened an office. He was 10 years long chairperson of the professional organisation of architects and member of the Hamburg Parliament for 14 years. In 1880 Haller and 8 other architects founded a syndicate and presented the Senate of Hamburg a new draft for the Hamburg Rathaus. In 1886 the construction started.

Haller planned more than 562 building projects.

Influenced 

Haller was influenced by Charles Garnier; the architect of the Paris opera; Gottfried Semper, and the Italian High Renaissance. He disliked the Art Nouveau movement.

Selected works 
 Hamburg Rathaus
 Alsterufer # 27 (now Consulate General of the United States in Hamburg and modified)
 Office building (bank) for M.M.Warburg & CO
 Concert hall Laeiszhalle
 Office building for the Reederei Woermann, coll. Afrikahaus
 Office building for Hamburg-Amerikanische Packetfahrt-Actien-Gesellschaft (HAPAG)
 Hochschule für Musik und Theater Hamburg

Honors 
The city of Hamburg honored Haller with a street called Hallerstraße.

References

External links 

 

1835 births
1925 deaths
19th-century German architects
Members of the Hamburg Parliament
Architects from Hamburg
People educated at the Gelehrtenschule des Johanneums